Julia Lohoff (née Wachaczyk; born 13 April 1994) is a German tennis player.

She is a doubles specialist who reached her career-high doubles ranking by the WTA of No. 61 in February 2022.

Lohoff has won one doubles title on the WTA Tour, as well as nine singles and 31 doubles titles on the ITF Circuit.

Since mid-2021, she is married to Tim Lohoff, a Biologist and PhD student based in England.

Doubles performance timeline

Only WTA Tour and Grand Slam tournament results are considered in the career statistics.

Current through the 2022 WTA Tour.

WTA career finals

Doubles: 1 (1 title)

ITF finals

Singles: 12 (9 titles, 3 runner–ups)

Doubles: 49 (31 titles, 18 runner–ups)

References

External links
 
 

1994 births
Living people
German female tennis players
Sportspeople from Bielefeld
Tennis people from North Rhine-Westphalia
20th-century German women
21st-century German women